Zakya H. Ismail (born 1948) is an Egyptian scientist who is professor of Electrical Engineering at Lehigh University. Her research considers printed electronics and photonics. She was the first woman to be appointed to the National Science Foundation Director of the Division of Materials Research.

Early life and education 
Kafafi was born in Cairo, Egypt. She has said that she became interested in chemistry whilst she was at high school, and that her science teacher frequently referred to her as The Chemist. She started her undergraduate degree in chemistry at the University of Houston, where she minored in mathematics. She moved to Rice University for her graduate studies and gained her MA and PhD in chemistry, and worked on low-temperature spectroscopy. At Rice University Kafafi was friends with Marilyn E. Jacox. After completing her doctorate, Kafafi moved to Cairo, where she was appointed Assistant Professor.

Research and career 
In 1986, while on a sabbatical, Kafafi visited the United States, where she learned about a job that was open in the Optical Sciences Division at the United States Naval Research Laboratory (NRL). Kafafi eventually joined NRL, where she established the organic optoelectronics section. Here she worked on nonlinear optical materials and colour centre lasers. She transitioned from chemistry to materials science and eventually ended up in physics, studying the properties of OLEDs. Kafafi spent over twenty years working at the NRL, during which time OLED displays found their way into televisions and mobile phones.

In 2007 Kafafi was appointed to the National Science Foundation Director of the Division of Materials Research, during which time she oversaw a billion dollar budget. She was the first woman to hold such a position. In 2010 Kafafi returned to Egypt, where she looked to develop partnerships that promoted solar energy across the country.

Kafafi joined the faculty at Lehigh University in 2008, where she was made Distinguished Research Fellow in the Department of Electrical Engineering. Here she has developed metallic plasmonic nanostructures that can increase light absorption and the efficiency of photovoltaics. These nanostructures make it possible to increase the optical absorption of the active layer of photovoltaics without increasing the layer thickness, allowing for improved device performance without compromising the flexibility or weight.

From 2011 to 2016 Kafafi served as Editor-in-Chief of the Journal of Photonics for Energy. In 2014 Kafafi became the inaugural editor of the journal Science Advances.

Awards and honours 

 2004 NRL Edison Patent Award
 2005 Elected Fellow of the American Association for the Advancement of Science
 2007 Elected Fellow of The Optical Society
 2007 Elected Fellow of the American Association for the Advancement of Science
 2015 Elected Fellow of the Materials Research Society
 2017 American Chemical Society Hillebrand Prize
 2018 Kuwait Foundation for the Advancement of Sciences Kuwait Prize in Applied Sciences
 2021 Elected Member of the National Academy of Engineering

Select publications

References 

1948 births
Living people
Egyptian scientists
Rice University alumni
University of Houston alumni
Fellows of the American Association for the Advancement of Science
Fellows of Optica (society)
Fellows of SPIE
Members of the United States National Academy of Engineering
Women materials scientists and engineers
Women in optics